Roger Hammond (born 30 January 1974) is a male English retired bicycle racer, specialising in cyclo-cross and road cycling.

Education
Hammond grew up in Chalfont St Peter in Buckinghamshire and attended Dr Challoner's Grammar School as a teenager. While still at school he won the 1992 world junior cyclo-cross championship in Leeds, but elected to concentrate on his university studies before pursuing a cycling career.

Cycling career
Hammond represented England in the road race event, at the 1998 Commonwealth Games in Kuala Lumpur, Malaysia. He repeated this achievement four years later at the 2002 Commonwealth Games.

He was the British road champion in 2003 and 2004. Hammond rode for the Great Britain team in the 2005 and 2006 Tour of Britain.

Post cycling
In July 2012 Roger Hammond was announced as the Team Manager of the newly formed Madison-Genesis team. In November 2015 he announced that he would join  as a sports director for the 2016 season, initially combining the position with his Madison-Genesis role. He returned to Madison-Genesis for the team's last season in 2019.

Hammond was in December 2019 named as performance director for the Bahrain-McLaren team for the 2020 season.

He joined the Ineos Grenadiers in October 2021 as head of racing.

Hammond has also worked as a pundit for ITV4, providing analysis of the Vuelta a España.

Major results

Cyclo-cross

1991–1992
 1st  UCI World Junior Championships
1993–1994
 1st  National Championships
1999–2000
 1st  National Championships
2000–2001
 1st  National Championships
2001–2002
 1st  National Championships
 National Trophy Series
1st Leicestershire
1st London
2002–2003
 1st  National Championships
2003–2004
 1st  National Championships
 National Trophy Series
1st Leicestershire
2005–2006
 1st  National Championships
2007–2008
 1st  National Championships
2008–2009
 3rd National Championships

Road

1998
 2nd Road race, National Road Championships
2000
 1st Archer Grand Prix
 1st Grand Prix Bodson
 2nd Grand Prix Fayt-Le-Franc
 3rd Schaal Sels
 10th Gent–Wevelgem
2001
 1st Textielprijs Vichte
 2nd Grand Prix Pino Cerami
 3rd Veenendaal–Veenendaal
 4th Le Samyn
 5th Schaal Sels
2002
 1st Tour Beneden-Maas
 1st Grote 1-MeiPrijs
 1st Sprints classification, Tour of Rhodes
 4th Road race, National Road Championships
 5th Schaal Sels
2003
 1st  Road race, National Road Championships
 1st  Overall Uniqa Classic
1st  Points classification
1st Stage 2
 2nd GP Jef Scherens Leuven
 2nd Stage 5 Étoile de Bessèges
 8th Gent–Wevelgem
 8th Paris–Bourges
2004
 1st  Road race, National Road Championships
 3rd Paris–Roubaix
 3rd Dwars door Vlaanderen
 3rd Grand Prix Rudy Dhaenens
 6th Le Samyn
 6th Gent–Wevelgem
 7th Road race, Olympic Games
2005
 1st Stage 2 Tour of Britain
 2nd Dwars door Vlaanderen
 2nd Nationale Sluitingsprijs
2006
 1st Stage 2 Tour of Britain
 2nd Road race, National Road Championships
2007
 2nd Gent–Wevelgem
2008
 10th Gent–Wevelgem
2009
 3rd Overall Tour of Qatar
1st Stage 2
 3rd Overall Tour of Denmark
 3rd Overall Tour de l'Eurométropole
 4th Paris–Bourges
 5th Road race, National Road Championships
2010
 4th Paris–Roubaix
 7th Tour of Flanders

Classic results timeline

References

1974 births
Living people
British male cyclists
English male cyclists
Cyclo-cross cyclists
Cyclists at the 2004 Summer Olympics
Cyclists at the 2008 Summer Olympics
Olympic cyclists of Great Britain
British cycling road race champions
Alumni of Brunel University London
People from Chalfont St Peter
People educated at Dr Challoner's Grammar School
English sports executives and administrators
Cyclists at the 1998 Commonwealth Games
Cyclists at the 2002 Commonwealth Games
Commonwealth Games competitors for England